The Municipality of Zavrč is a municipality in the Haloze area of Slovenia, on the border with Croatia. Its seat is the village of Zavrč. The area is part of the traditional region of Styria. The municipality is now included in the Drava Statistical Region.

Settlements
In addition to the namesake town, the municipality also includes the following settlements:
 Belski Vrh
 Drenovec
 Gorenjski Vrh
 Goričak
 Hrastovec
 Korenjak
 Pestike
 Turški Vrh

References

External links
 
 Zavrč municipal site
 Municipality of Zavrč at Geopedia

Zavrč
1999 establishments in Slovenia